The Karachi Kings is a franchise cricket team that represents Karachi in the Pakistan Super League. They are one of the five teams that had a competition in the 2017 Pakistan Super League. The team was captained by Kumar Sangakkara, and they stand on third position after winning four matches from their eight matches in the PSL 2017.

Squad
Kumar Sangakkara and Babar Azam joined Karachi for the second season of the PSL whilst Azhar Mehmood signed as a coach. Sohail Tanvir was traded for Chris Gayle of Lahore Qalandars during the off-season trade window. During the 2017 PSL players draft Karachi retained Shoaib Malik, Imad Wasim, Ravi Bopara, Mohammad Amir, Sohail Khan, Saifullah Bangash, and Shahzaib Hasan. The team added nine players to the squad, including Kieron Pollard, Mahela Jayawardena and Ryan McLaren.

Pakistan Super League
In their first game, Karachi Kings lost to Peshawar Zalmi by 7 wickets in one-sided affair that saw them post a target of just 118 in their 20 overs. In the following game, against the Quetta Gladiators, the Kings failed to defend 160 and lost by 7 wickets yet again. Even as the tournament progressed to Sharjah, the Kings continued their losing streak. Facing a loss this time to arch-rivals, Lahore Qalandars. The match was closely fought and a partnership of 101 runs between veterans Kumar Sangakkara and Shoaib Malik almost won it for the Kings. But in the end they fell short of the target of 180 by 7 runs. But in the next game, against defending champions Islamabad United. the team finally managed to put themselves on the points table. The win came through the Duckworth-Lewis method as the Kings were ahead of the par score by 8 runs when returning rain forced to abandon the already 13-over match. In their final game of the Sharjah leg, the Kings continued their winning streak to get past Peshawar Zalmi in a thrilling contest. Setting up a target of 175, the Kings had the Zalmis reduced to 69-6 before Shahid Afridi and Darren Sammy combined in a 70-run partnership that almost won the game for the Zalmis. However, the King's bowling prevailed in the end to give their team a 9-run victory.

As the tournament moved back to Dubai, the Kings couldn't continue their winning streak and lost to table-toppers, Quetta Gladiators, by 6 wickets. Batting first, the Kings set a target of 155 runs, which they were unable to defend despite a 3-wicket-over from pacer Sohail Khan. This loss pushed the Karachi Kings to the bottom of the table once again. However, in the next game, which had become a must-win for both participating teams, the Kings managed to prevail over the Lahore Qalandars in a thrilling last-ball finish. Chasing 156, the team required 10 runs from the last two balls, which Kieron Pollard surpassed with back-to-back sixes to keep his team alive in the tournament. They qualified for Eliminator, where they defeated Islamabad United to advance to Qualifier 2.

Season standings
Karachi Kings finished third in the points table of 2017 Pakistan Super League.

References

2017 in Sindh
2017 Pakistan Super League
Kings in 2017
2017